San Félix is a village or populated centre in the Paysandú Department of western Uruguay. It is a southern suburb of the city of Paysandú and it contains the horse race tracks of the city, the Hipódromo San Felix.

Geography
It is located directly south of the city, on an extension of Independencia Street and across the stream Arroyo Sacra.

Population
In 2011, San Félix had a population of 1,718.
 
Source: Instituto Nacional de Estadística de Uruguay

References

External links
INE map of Paysandú and San Félix

Populated places in the Paysandú Department